Walter Marven Borden,  (born July 20, 1942) is a Canadian actor, poet and playwright. He is originally from New Glasgow, Nova Scotia. His film and television credits include Nurse.Fighter.Boy, The Event, Gerontophilia, Lexx and Platinum.

Most prominent as a stage actor, he joined Halifax's Neptune Theatre company in 1972. He has since appeared in stage productions across Canada, including William Shakespeare's Hamlet, Richard III, A Midsummer Night's Dream, The Merchant of Venice and Henry VIII, Aeschylus' Agamemnon, Jean-Paul Sartre's The Flies, James Weldon Johnson's God's Trombones: Seven Negro Sermons in Verse, Tennessee Williams' Orpheus Descending and Cat on a Hot Tin Roof,  and Djanet Sears' Harlem Duet and The Adventures of a Black Girl in Search of God. Since 2003, he has been a member of the Stratford Festival of Canada.

He has also recorded and released an album, Walter Borden Reads Shakespeare's Sonnets to the Music of Fernando Sor, in collaboration with classical guitarist Paul Martell.

Personal life
Openly gay, he also wrote and performed his own autobiographical play Tightrope Time: Ain't Nuthin' More Than Some Itty Bitty Madness Between Twilight and Dawn, one of the first plays in the history of Black Canadian literature to directly present themes of male homosexuality. His later writing credits include Testifyin′ and Tellin′ It Like It Is.

Filmography

Film

Television

Awards
Borden was awarded the Queen Elizabeth II Golden Jubilee Medal, the African Nova Scotia Music Association (ANSMA) Music Heritage Award, and the Portia White Prize, which is awarded annually by the Nova Scotia Arts Council to someone who has made a significant contribution to culture and the arts in Nova Scotia. He was named a Member of the Order of Canada in 2006. In 2007, Borden was awarded the Martin Luther King Jr. Achievement Award for his prominence as a theater actor.

References

External links

1942 births
Living people
20th-century Canadian poets
20th-century Canadian male writers
Canadian male poets
20th-century Canadian dramatists and playwrights
Canadian male stage actors
Members of the Order of Canada
Members of the Order of Nova Scotia
Black Canadian male actors
Black Canadian writers
Male actors from Nova Scotia
Writers from Nova Scotia
Black Nova Scotians
People from New Glasgow, Nova Scotia
Canadian gay actors
Canadian gay writers
Canadian male film actors
Canadian male television actors
Canadian male voice actors
Canadian LGBT dramatists and playwrights
Canadian LGBT poets
Canadian male dramatists and playwrights
Black Canadian LGBT people
Gay poets
Gay dramatists and playwrights
20th-century Canadian LGBT people